International Docking System could mean:
 International Docking System Standard, international standard for spacecraft docking adapters.
 International Berthing and Docking Mechanism, European androgynous low impact docking mechanism.